Nahetal-Waldau is a former municipality in the district of Hildburghausen, in Thuringia, Germany. Since July 2018, it is part of the town of Schleusingen.

Geography

Geographical Location

The municipality of Nahetal-Waldau was located in the Thuringian Forest.  The districts of Waldau and Oberrod are located in the valley of the lock, and the hamlets of Schleusingerneundorf and Hinternah are located in the Nahe Valley.

Community

The districts in the municipality were:

Hinternah
Oberrod
Schleusingerneundorf
Silbach
Waldau

References

External links 

 Website of the Nahetal-Waldau community
 Website of the official tourist association Nahetal-Waldau Thüringer Wald

Former municipalities in Thuringia
Hildburghausen (district)